The Hawker P.1103 was a design by Hawker Aircraft to meet the British Operational Requirement F.155; it did not progress further than the drawing board.

Background
Operational Requirement F.155 was an Operational Requirement issued by the British Ministry of Supply in 1955 for an interceptor aircraft to defend the United Kingdom from high flying supersonic bombers.

F.155 specified exacting demands:
The capability of making an intercept within 20 minutes of target contact (250 miles from the UK) with a target speed of Mach 1+
Ceiling: 60,000 ft (18,000 m)
Armament: a mixture of infra-red guided missiles and radar guided missiles
Crew: A crew of two was specified because of the anticipated workload: pilot plus weapon systems operator (WSO)/navigator

The Ministry of Supply made clear in the requirement that the plane and missiles should be treated as a "weapon system" i.e., a cohesive whole. The armament specifications were covered by a separate Operational Requirement, OR.1131, which listed two missile systems: the infra-red guided de Havilland "Blue Vesta" and the radar-guided Vickers "Red Hebe".

The submission by Hawker Siddeley a design by the legendary designer Sir Sydney Camm was effectively a supersonic development of his successful Hawker Hunter design, using a single engine - a 25,000 lb  development of the de Havilland Gyron breathing through an under-chin air intake. Two detachable rocket boosters, to give a 3.7 minute boost, were carried in mid-wing nacelles.

1957 Defence White Paper

Although a nuclear threat from high-flying Soviet supersonic nuclear-armed bombers was identified in 1955, F.155 calling for supersonic interceptors (in service by 1962) was superseded by the 1957 Defence White Paper. The paper was a major review of military spending and one of its elements was the cancellation of nearly all manned fighter projects as a radical change had occurred in strategic threats with the expectation that intercontinental ballistic missiles and low-level strike would replace high flying bombers.

Specifications

See also

Related development

Hawker P.1121

Aircraft of comparable role, configuration and era

Convair F-106 Delta Dart
Dassault Mirage III
English Electric Lightning
Lockheed F-104A
MiG-21
Saab 35 Draken
Sukhoi Su-9

References

Further reading
 
 
 
 

Cancelled military aircraft projects of the United Kingdom
P.1103